Juan Fernández Martín (born 5 January 1957 in Alhama de Granada) is a Spanish former professional road racing cyclist and directeur sportif. During his career, he won four stages at the Vuelta a España, as well as the Mountains classification in 1980. He also finished third in the World Cycling Championships three times and won the Spanish National Road Race Championship in 1980 and 1988.

Major results

1979
1st Stage 1a Escalada a Montjuïc
1st GP Navarra
2nd Overall GP Leganes
1st Stage 1
9th Rund um den Henninger Turm
1980
1st  Road race, National Road Championships
1st Stage 8 Giro d'Italia
1st  Mountains classification Vuelta a España
1st Overall Costa del Azahar
1st Stages 1 & 5
1st Overall GP Navarra
1st Stage 1
1st Stage 1 Vuelta a Asturias
1st Stage 1b Escalada a Montjuïc
1st Klasika Primavera
2nd À travers Lausanne
3rd  Road race, UCI Road World Championships
10th Overall Volta a Catalunya
1st Prologue & Stage 6
1981
Tour of the Basque Country
1st Stages 1 & 2
1st Stage 7 Vuelta a España
1st Stage 3 Volta a la Comunitat Valenciana
1st Stage 2 Vuelta a los Valles Mineros
1st GP Pascuas
2nd Overall Vuelta a Aragón
1st Stage 1
3rd Overall Vuelta a La Rioja
1st Stage 2
3rd Road race, National Road Championships
3rd Coppa Ugo Agostoni
3rd Trofeo Luis Puig
5th Tre Valli Varesine
7th Overall Deutschland Tour
1st Stage 1
7th Clásica de San Sebastián
1982
1st Stage 18 Vuelta a España
1st Stage 5 Volta a la Comunitat Valenciana
1st Stage 2 Vuelta a Asturias
1st Stage 3 Vuelta a La Rioja
2nd Overall Costa del Azahar
2nd GP Navarra
3rd Klasika Primavera
6th Trofeo Masferrer
7th Road race, UCI Road World Championships
8th Overall Tour of the Basque Country
1983
Costa del Azahar
1st Stages 2 & 4
1st Stage 1 Vuelta a España
1st Stage 2 Tour of the Basque Country
1st Klasika Primavera
1st GP Navarra
6th Milan–San Remo
9th Overall Vuelta a Andalucía
1984
2nd Clásica a los Puertos
1985
1st Stage 4 Vuelta a Asturias
1st Stage 3 Vuelta a Cantabria
1st Clásica a los Puertos
3rd Clásica de San Sebastián
6th Road race, UCI Road World Championships
1986
1st Stage 4 Volta a Catalunya
1st Stage 7 Vuelta a Castilla y León
3rd Clásica de San Sebastián
4th Road race, UCI Road World Championships
1987
1st Stage 14 Vuelta a España
3rd  Road race, UCI Road World Championships
10th Overall Setmana Catalana de Ciclisme
1988
1st  Road race, National Road Championships
3rd  Road race, UCI Road World Championships

External links

Living people
Spanish male cyclists
1957 births
Spanish Vuelta a España stage winners
Sportspeople from the Province of Granada
Cyclists from Andalusia